Competitor for  Canada
 

Dr George Harrold "Doc" Campbell (February 1, 1878 – November 4, 1972) was a Canadian dentist and lacrosse player who competed in the 1908 Summer Olympics. In 1908 he was part of the Canadian team which won the gold medal.

References

External links
profile

1878 births
1972 deaths
Canadian lacrosse players
Olympic lacrosse players of Canada
Lacrosse players at the 1908 Summer Olympics
Olympic gold medalists for Canada
Medalists at the 1908 Summer Olympics
Olympic medalists in lacrosse